Photodotis adornata is a moth of the family Gelechiidae. It was described by Omelko in 1993. It is found in the Russian Far East (Primorsky Krai), Korea and Japan.

The wingspan is 11–13 mm.

References

Moths described in 1993
Photodotis